Mohammad Ali Shadman (born 24 November 1996) is an Iranian actor. He is best known for his acting in M for Mother that was selected as the Iranian entry for the Best Foreign Language Film at the 80th Academy Awards, but it was not nominated. He's also known for Divar Be Divar (2017–2018), Drown (2020), I Want to Live (2021) and Rebel (2022). Shadman earned a Crystal Simorgh for Best Actor nomination for his performance in Drowning in Holy Water.

Early life
Mohammad Ali Shadman was born on 24 November 1996 in Ilam. He has a sister named Arina and is the first child in the family.

Career

He was first introduced to Iranian cinema by Rasoul Mollagholipour and Mohammad Reza Balali, his best friend in the film M for Mother, because of his ability to play the violin.

Filmography

Film

Web

Television

Awards and nominations

References

External links 
 

Iranian male television actors
Iranian male film actors
People from Tehran
Living people
Webarchive template wayback links
1996 births